The Dongfang Power Station, also spelled Dongfang Power Plant, is a generating plant project in Hainan,  located in Xiaozhou Industrial Development Zone, Dongfang City. It is the first supercritical coal-fired power plant in the history of Hainan Province.

History
The construction of Dongfang Power Station started on 28 September 2007, and the first phase of the project was put into operation on 28 December 2009, with a total investment of 3.25 billion yuan. 

At the end of 2010, the second phase of Dongfang Power Station was officially started,  approved by the National Development and Reform Commission, with a total investment of 2.6 billion yuan.

On May 6, 2012, the No. 3 unit of Dongfang Power Plant Phase II 2×350 MW coal-fired unit project completed 168 hours of trial operation and was directly transferred to operation.

References 

2009 establishments in China
Energy infrastructure completed in 2009
Coal-fired power stations in China